State Route 380 (SR 380) is a short east–west highway in McMinnville, Tennessee.

Route description 
SR 380 begins at an intersection with SR 55, US 70S, and SR 1 in northwestern McMinnville. US 70S/SR 1 goes east from Woodbury and turns northeast at this intersection. SR 55 begins at the south fork of the intersection and SR 380 begins at the east fork.

SR 380 goes southeast into downtown McMinnville as West Main Street and becomes two separate one-way streets in downtown. Eastbound SR 380 retains the name West Main Street (which becomes East Main Street after an intersection with SR 56) and westbound SR 380 is called West Morford Street (which becomes East Morford Street after an intersection with SR 56). This goes for approximately  until both streets come back together to form Sparta Street just east of downtown. SR 380 (Sparta Street) continues northeast before terminating at US 70S/SR 1.

History 

SR 380 is the former routing of US 70S/SR 1 through downtown McMinnville prior to the 4-lane bypass being built to the north and east between 1994 and 2002.

Junction list

See also 
List of state routes in Tennessee

References

External links
 

380
Transportation in Warren County, Tennessee